"Directorium" is a Latin word denoting a guide. In the later Middle Ages it was specially applied to Catholic liturgical guides for praying the Divine Office and Holy Mass.

Early history

For example, in the early fifteenth century Clement Maydeston, probably following foreign precedents, titled his reorganized Sarum Ordinal the "Directorium Sacerdotum". In this way the words "Directorium Sacerdotum" came to be included in the beginning of many books, some of them among the earliest products of the printing press in England, that served to instruct clergy as to the form of Divine Office and Mass to be prayed each day of the year.

The use of "directorium" was not peculiar to England. For example, and not as the earliest one, a very similar work was published at Augsburg in 1501 with the title Index sive Directorium Missarum Horarumque secundum ritum chori Constanciensis diocesis dicendarumn. This title evidences that a directorium, i. e. a guide for praying the Divine Office and Mass, had to be formatted according to the needs of a specific diocese or group of dioceses, because, as a rule, each diocese has certain feasts peculiar to itself, and these must be considered in determining the format of the Divine Office; merely one change often occasioned much disturbance by necessitating the transfer of coincident feasts to other days. From the Directorium Sacerdotum, which in England was often denominated the "Pye" and which seems to have come into almost general use about the time of the invention of printing, the later Directory, i. e. the Ordo Divini Officii recitandi Sacrique peragendi gradually developed.

Present use

It is presently the custom for every Catholic diocese, or, in cases where the calendar followed is substantially identical, for a group of dioceses belonging to the same ecclesiastical province or state, to have a directory, i. e. Ordo recitandi, annually printed for clerical use. It is a calendar for the year in which are printed for each day concise directions for praying the Divine Office and Mass of that day. The calendar usually indicates days of fasting, eligibility for special indulgences, days of devotion, and other information that may be convenient for the clergy to know. The Ordo is issued with the authority of the bishop or bishops concerned, and is binding on the clergy in their jurisdiction. Religious orders in the diocese usually have their own directories which, in the case of the larger orders, often differ according to the state in which they are present.

For secular clergy the calendar of the Roman Missal and Roman Breviary, apart from special privilege, always forms the basis of the Ordo recitandi. To this the feasts celebrated in the diocese are added, and, as the higher grade of these special celebrations often causes them to take precedence of those in the ordinary calendar, a certain amount of shifting and transposition is inevitable, even apart from the complications caused by the movable feasts. All this must be calculated and arranged beforehand in accordance with the rules of the general rubrics of the Missal and Breviary. Even so, the clergy of particular churches must further provide for the celebration of their own patronal or dedicatory feasts, and to make such other changes in the Ordo as these insertions may impose. The Ordo is always in Latin, though an exception is sometimes made in the directories for nuns, and, as it is often supplemented with a few extra pages of diocesan notices, recent decrees of the Congregation of Rites, regulations for praying votive offices, et cetera, these being matters only affecting clergy, the Ordo is apt to acquire a somewhat technical and exclusive quality.

Tradition

For how long a separate and annual Ordo recitandi has been printed for the use of English clergy seems impossible to determine. Possibly Bishop Challoner, Vicar Apostolic from 1741 to 1781, had something to do with its introduction. But in 1759 a Catholic printer in London conceived the idea of translating the official Directorium, i. e. Ordo, issued for the clergy, and accordingly published in that year A Lay Directory or a help to find out and assist at Vespers . . . . on Sundays and Holy Days. Strange to say, another Catholic printer, seemingly the publisher of the official Ordo, shortly afterwards, conceiving his privileges invaded, produced a rival publication titled The Laity's Directory or the Order of the (Catholic) Church Service for the year 1764. The Laity's Directory was issued each year for 3 quarters of a century and gradually grew in length. In 1837 The Catholic Directory supplanted it, which Messrs. Burns and Lambert, later Burns and Oates, has published in London since 1855. The earliest numbers of The Laity's Directory contained nothing save an abbreviated translation of the clerical Ordo recitandi, but toward the end of the eighteenth century a list of the Catholic chapels in London, advertisements of schools, obituary notices, important ecclesiastical announcements, and other miscellaneous matters began to be added, and at a still later date an index of the names and addresses of the Catholic clergy serving the missions in England and Scotland was added. This index was imitated in the Irish Catholic Director and in The Catholic Directory of the United States. Hence the idea became widespread that Catholic directories are so denominated because they commonly form an address book for the churches and clergy of a particular state, but an examination of the early numbers of The Laity's Directory demonstrates that it was only to the calendar with its indications for the Mass and Divine Office that the name originally applied.

In the Middle Ages, and indeed almost to the invention of printing, the liturgical books were more numerous than at present, presenting content in more volumes. For example, instead of one volume containing the whole Divine Office, as is presently the case for the Breviary, the Office was contained in at least 4 books, namely the Psalterium, Hymnarium, Antiphonarium, and Legendarium (book of lessons, i. e., readings).

Rubrics or ritual directions for the Mass and Divine Office were rarely written in connection with the text to which they belonged (this is not to treat of the services of rarer occurrence such as those in the Pontifical), but they were probably at first communicated only by oral tradition, and when they began to be recorded they took only such summary form as is seen in the Ordines Romani of Hittorp and Mabillon. However, circa the eleventh century there arose a tendency toward greater elaboration and precision in rubrical directions for the services, and at the same time the beginning of a more or less strongly marked division of these directions into two classes arose, which in the case of the Sarum Use were conveniently distinguished as the Customary and the Ordinal. Generally, the former of these rubrical books contained the principles and the latter their application; the former determined those matters that were constant and primarily the duties of persons, the latter dealt with the arrangements that varied from day to day and year to year.

It is out of the Ordinal, often denominated the Ordinarium and Liber Ordinarius, that the Directorium or Pye, and later the Ordo recitandi evolved. These distinctions are not clear because the process was gradual. But in the English and Continental Ordinals 2 different stages can be distinguished: first, the type of book in common use from the twelfth to fifteenth century, and represented by the Sarum Ordinal edited by W. H. Frere and the Ordinaria of Laon edited by Chevalier. In them was much miscellaneous information respecting feasts, the Divine Office and Mass to be prayed thereon according to the changes necessitated by the occurrence of Easter and the shifting of the Sundays, as well as the "Incipits" of the details of the liturgy, e. g. of the lessons to be read and the commemorations to be made. The second stage took the form of an adaptation of the Ordinal for ready use, an adaptation with which, in the case of Sarum, the name of Clement Maydeston is prominent connected. This was the Directorium Sacerdotum or the complete Pye, titled Pica Sarum in Latin, abbreviated editions of which were afterwards published in a form which allowed it to be bound up with the respective portions of the Breviary. The idea of this great Pye was to give all the 35 possible combinations, 5 to each dominical letter, of which the immovable and movable feasts of the ecclesiastical year admitted, assigning a separate calendar to each, more or less corresponding to the later Ordo recitandi. This arrangement was not peculiar to England.

One of the earliest printed books of the kind was that issued about 1475 for the Diocese of Constance, of which a rubricated copy is in the British Library. It is a small folio in size, of 112 leaves, and after the ordinary calendar it supplies summary rules, in 35 sections, for composing the special calendar for each year according to the Golden Number and the dominical letter. Then the Ordo for each of the 35 possible combinations is given in detail. The name most commonly given to these "Pyes" in continental Europe was Ordinarius and more rarely Directorium Missae. For example, the title of such a book printed for the Diocese of Liège in 1492 read: "In nomine Domini Amen . . . Incipit liber Ordinarius ostendens qualiter legatur et cantetur per totum anni circulum in ecclesia leodiensi tam de tempore quam de festis sanctorum in nocturnis officiis divinis." Such books were also provided for the religious orders. An Ordinarius Ordinis Praemonstratensis exists in manuscript in Jesus College, Cambridge, England, and an early printed one in the British Library. When printing became universal, the step from these rather copious directories, which served for all possible years, to a shorter guide of the type of the later Ordo recitandi, and intended only for a specific year, was an easy one. Since, however, such publications are useless after their purpose is once served, they are very liable to destruction, and it seems impossible to date the first attempt to produce an ordo after this later fashion. The fact that at the Council of Trent (Session 23, De Reform., Chapter 18) it was thought necessary to urge that ecclesiastical students be taught to understand the Computus, by which they could determine the Ordo recitandi for each year for themselves, seems to imply that such later ordos were not in familiar use in the middle of the sixteenth century.

See also
Catholic Directory

External links
Catholic Encyclopedia article

Catholic liturgical books
Latin words and phrases